The Pakistani cricket team toured Australia in December 1976 to play three Test matches. The series was drawn 1-1. Pakistan won the final match of the series, which was their first Test victory in Australia.

During the first test of the series at Adelaide, Australian fast bowler Jeff Thomson collided with Alan Turner which resulted in a dislocated shoulder for Thommo. According to Several Cricket historians and cricketers from that era Thomson lost his lethal pace after the collision. Although he was still very quick but his Venomous speed was never the same after the incident. During third test at SCG, Imran Khan took Six-wicket haul in both innings of the test match resulting in victory for Pakistan. Khan's 12-Wicket haul in the match are best ever bowling figures by an Asian bowler on Australian soil till date.

Pakistan's win at Sydney is considered as a landmark event in their sporting history. The rise of Pakistan cricket in modern era is largely attributed to this victory.

Test series summary

First Test

Second Test

Third Test
{{Two-innings cricket match
| date = 14–18 January 1977
| team1 = 
| team2 = 

| score-team1-inns1 = 211 (64.2 overs)
| runs-team1-inns1 = GJ Cosier 50 (73)
| wickets-team1-inns1 = Imran Khan 6/102 (26 overs)

| score-team2-inns1 = 360 (82.3 overs)
| runs-team2-inns1 = Asif Iqbal 120 (213)
| wickets-team2-inns1 = MHN Walker 4/112 (29 overs)

| score-team1-inns2 = 180 (41.7 overs)
| runs-team1-inns2 = RW Marsh 41 (80)
| wickets-team1-inns2 = Imran Khan 6/63 (19.7 overs)

| score-team2-inns2 = 32/2 (7.2 overs)
| runs-team2-inns2 = Majid Khan 26* (27)
| wickets-team2-inns2 = DK Lillee 2/24 (4 overs)

| result = Pakistan won by 8 wickets
| report = Scorecard
| venue = Sydney Cricket Ground, Sydney
| umpires = TF Brooks and RR Ledwidge
| toss = Australia won the toss and elected to bat.
| rain = 17 January was taken as a rest day.The match was scheduled for five days but completed in four.| notes = Haroon Rasheed made his Test debut.
}}

Annual reviews
 Playfair Cricket Annual 1977
 Wisden Cricketers' Almanack 1977

Further reading
 Bill Frindall, The Wisden Book of Test Cricket 1877-1978, Wisden, 1979
 Chris Harte, A History of Australian Cricket'', André Deutsch, 1993

References

External sources
 CricketArchive – tour summaries

1976 in Australian cricket
1976 in Pakistani cricket
1976–77 Australian cricket season
1977 in Australian cricket
1977 in Pakistani cricket
International cricket competitions from 1975–76 to 1980
1976-77